Tessa  (French title: Tessa, la nymphe au cœur fidèle) is a play written in 1934 by French dramatist Jean Giraudoux. It is a translation and adaptation of a 1926 stage version by Margaret Kennedy and Basil Dean of the former's 1924 novel The Constant Nymph.

Original productions
 Tessa  was first performed on 14 November 1934 in Paris at the Théâtre de l'Athénée in a production by Louis Jouvet.

References

Plays by Jean Giraudoux
1934 plays